John Benjamin Splann (June 22, 1875 - March 24, 1962) was a Democratic member of the Mississippi House of Representatives, representing Alcorn County, from 1916 to 1920.

Biography 
John Benjamin Splann was born on June 22, 1875, in McNairy County, Tennessee, to John Edwin Splann and Mollie N. (Howell) Splann. However, he grew up in nearby Corinth, Mississippi. He married Maude Potts in 1901. He was ordained a Christian minister in 1902. He was elected to the Mississippi House of Representatives to represent Alcorn County, as a Democrat, in 1915. He died on March 24, 1962, in Kendrick, Mississippi.

References 

1875 births
1962 deaths
People from McNairy County, Tennessee
People from Corinth, Mississippi
Democratic Party members of the Mississippi House of Representatives